Takhteh Duz (also Romanized as Takhteh Dūz; also known as Takhteh Dozī and Takhteh Dūzī) is a village in Qaleh Darrehsi Rural District, in the Central District of Maku County, West Azerbaijan Province, Iran. At the 2006 census, its population was 324, in 59 families.

References 

Populated places in Maku County